Eslamabad (also Romanized as Eslāmābād; also known as Shāhābād and Shaikhābād) is a village in Marhemetabad-e Miyani Rural District, Marhemetabad District, Miandoab County, West Azerbaijan Province, Iran. At the 2006 census, its population was 851, in 191 families.

References 

Populated places in Miandoab County